Conchalí is a commune of Chile located in Santiago Province, Santiago Metropolitan Region. It is a northwestern suburb of Santiago.

Demographics
The population fell by 12.9% (19663 persons) between the 1992 and 2002 censuses. Its 2006 population was projected at 120,151 persons.

Stats
Average annual household income: US$24,396 (PPP, 2006)
Population below poverty line: 8.0% (2006)
Regional quality of life index: 78.61, mid-high, 16 out of 52 (2005)
Human Development Index: 0.707, 118 out of 341 (2003)

Administration
As a commune, Conchalí is a third-level administrative division of Chile administered by a municipal council, headed by an alcalde who is directly elected every four years. The 2008-2012 alcalde was Rubén Malvoa Hernández (RN). The current incumbent is Carlos Sottolichio Urquiza (PPD), who was also mayor from 1992-2000 and 2003-2008. The communal council has the following members:
 Rubén Carvacho Rivera (UDI)
 Cecilia Delgado Delgado (PPD)
 María Guajardo Silva (PS)
 Ricardo Montero Riveros (PC)
 Máximo Pavez Cantillano (UDI)
 Paulina Rodríguez Gómez (RN)
 Alejandra Saa Carrasco (PPD)
 Alejandro Vargas González (DC)

Within the electoral divisions of Chile, Conchalí is represented in the Chamber of Deputies by Karla Rubilar (RN) and Daniel Farcas Guendelman (PPD) as part of the 17th electoral district, (together with Renca and Huechuraba). The commune is represented in the Senate by Guido Girardi Lavín (PPD) and Andrés Allamand Zavala (RN) as part of the 7th senatorial constituency (Santiago-West).

References

External links

  Municipality of Conchalí

Populated places in Santiago Province, Chile
Communes of Chile
Geography of Santiago, Chile
Populated places established in 1927
1927 establishments in Chile